Tapio Vilpponen (31 May 1913 − 31 August 1994) was a Finnish screenwriter, set designer, costume designer, painter, graphic artist, interior designer, sculptor, copywriter, journalist, cartoonist and columnist. He also starred in a few films. Vilpponen used the pseudonyms Roy and Juan Batiste Montauban.

Selected filmography as Roy 

Ryhmy ja Romppainen (1941)
Linnaisten vihreä kamari (1945)
Gabriel, tule takaisin (1951)
Pessi ja Illusia (1954)
Silja − nuorena nukkunut (1956)
Nuoruus vauhdissa (1961)
Valkoinen kissa (1965)

References

External links 
 

1913 births
1994 deaths
People from Rauma, Finland